Grosbous ( or (locally)) is a commune and small town in northwestern Luxembourg, in the canton of Redange.

, the town of Grosbous, which lies in the south of the commune, had a population of 619.  Other towns within the commune include Dellen.

On January 1, 2021, the population of Grosbous was 1,112. Since beginning of 2019, Grosbous had intense discussions with their neighbours, the Commune of Wahl concerning a fusion of the two communes. An important step in this process was the referendum of June 27, 2021, when the inhabitants of both communes expressed their opinion about the project of merging the two communes. The majority of voters in both communes supported the fusion, which will take place in September 2023, after the next municipal elections in June 2023.

Population

References

External links

Commune de Grosbous

Communes in Redange (canton)
Towns in Luxembourg